The Terminal Sales Building is an historic building in Portland, Oregon, United States. One of the few pieces of prominent Art Deco architecture in Portland, it is the only high-rise example. While the building's design may be credited to Wilfred Frank Higgins, Mr. Higgins was working under the architect A.E. Doyle, who referred to Higgins as his draftsman. Doyle was so involved with the project, that he continued to direct Higgins even while traveling in Europe, wiring the office instructions on paint specifications. 

The building was completed in 1927; it stands 155 feet (47 m) tall and has 13 above-ground floors. The Terminal Sales Building was placed on the National Register of Historic Places on October 17, 1991.

See also
Architecture of Portland, Oregon
National Register of Historic Places listings in Southwest Portland, Oregon
Shift Drinks

References

External links
 National Register of Historic Places Registration Form

Skyscraper office buildings in Portland, Oregon
Art Deco architecture in Oregon
National Register of Historic Places in Portland, Oregon
Office buildings completed in 1926
1927 establishments in Oregon
Southwest Portland, Oregon
Portland Historic Landmarks